The insurrection of 31 May – 2 June 1793, during the French Revolution, started after the Paris commune demanded that 22 Girondin deputies and members of the Commission of Twelve should be brought before the Revolutionary Tribunal. Jean-Paul Marat led the attack on the representatives in the National Convention, who in January had voted against the execution of the King and since then had paralyzed the Convention. It ended after thousands of armed citizens surrounded the Convention  to force the deputies to deliver the deputies denounced by the Commune.  The result was the fall of the 29 Girondins and two Ministers under pressure of the sans-culottes, Jacobins of the clubs, and Montagnards.

By its impact and importance, this insurrection stands as one of the three great popular insurrections of the French Revolution, following those of 14 July 1789 and 10 August 1792. The principal conspirators were the Enragés Dobsen and Varlet; Pache and Chaumette would lead the march on the Convention.

Background 
During the government of the Legislative Assembly (October 1791 – September 1792), Girondins had dominated French politics.

After the start of the newly elected National Convention in September 1792, the Girondin faction (c. 150) was larger than the montagnards (c. 120); most ministries were in the hands of friends or allies of the Girondins, also the state bureaucracy and the provinces remained under their control.

France was expecting the Convention to deliver its Constitution; instead, by the spring of 1793 it had civil war, invasion, difficulties, and dangers.
The economic situation was deteriorating rapidly. By the end of the winter, grain circulation had stopped completely and grain prices doubled. Against Saint-Just's advice, vast quantities of assignats were still being put in circulation. In February 1793, they had fallen to 50 percent of their face value. The depreciation provoked inflation and speculation.

Military setbacks against the First Coalition, Dumouriez's treason, and the War in the Vendée which had begun in March 1793 drove many republicans towards the montagnards. The Girondins were forced to accept the creation of the Committee of Public Safety and Revolutionary Tribunal.

While the inability of the Gironde to fend off all those dangers became evident, the Montagnards, in their determination to "save the Revolution", were gradually adopting the political program proposed by the popular militants.
Authority was passing into the hands of the 150 Montagnards delegated to the départements and armed forces. The Gironde saw its influence decline in the interior and the number of anti-Brissot petitions increased by late March 1793.

Toward the crisis 

On 5 April the Jacobins, presided by Marat, sent a circular letter to popular societies in the provinces inviting them to ask for the recall and dismissal of those appelants, who had voted for the decision to execute the King to be referred back to the people. On 13 April Guadet proposed that Marat be charged for having, as president of the club, signed that circular, and this proposal was passed by the Convention by 226 votes to 93, with 47 abstentions, following an angry debate. Marat's case was passed to the Revolutionary Tribunal, where Marat offered himself as "the apostle and martyr of liberty", and he was triumphantly acquitted on 24 April. Already on the 15th, thirty-five of the forty-eight Paris sections had presented a petition to the Convention couched in the most threatening terms against the twenty-two most prominent Girondins.

The Gironde turned its attack on the very citadel of Montagnard power, the Paris Commune.

In his reply to Camille Desmoulins's Histoire des Brissotins, read at the Jacobin club on 17 May, Guadet denounced the Commune, describing them as "authorities devoted to anarchy, and greedy for both money and political domination". He proposed that they be quashed immediately. A commission of twelve members, all Girondins, was set up to look into the matter. On 24 May, the commission ordered the arrest of Hébert for an anti-Girondin article in the Pere Duchesne, alongside other popular militants including Varlet and Dobsen, president of the Cite section. These measures brought on the final crisis.

On 25 May the Commune demanded that the arrested patriots be released. In reply, Isnard, who was presiding over the Convention, launched into a bitter diatribe against Paris reminiscent of the Brunswick Manifesto: "If any attack made on the persons of the representatives of the nation, then I declare to you in the name of the whole country that Paris would be destroyed; soon people would be searching along the banks of the Seine to find out whether Paris had ever existed". The next day, Robespierre led the Jacobin Club to declare themselves in a state of insurrection. The Convention caved to pressure and released Varlet and Dobsen on the 27th, only three days after their arrest.

The 29 May was occupied in preparing the public mind, according to François Mignet.  Delegates representing thirty-three of the sections met at the Évêché (the Bishop's Palace behind the Notre-Dame de Paris) declared themselves in a state of insurrection, dissolved the general council of the commune, and immediately reconstituted it, making it take a new oath.  Only representatives of the Montagne and the Plain attended. A committee of nine, including Varlet and Dobsen, was appointed to lead the revolt. Most of the committee were comparatively young men and little known. Varlet had, indeed, made his name as an agitator; Hassenfratz held an important post in the War Office; Dobsen had been foremen of the jury in the Revolutionary Tribunal; Rousselin edited the Feuille du Salut public. However, otherwise ordinary citizens including the printer Marquet, who presided over the Central Committee; its secretary Tombe; the painter Simon of the Halle-au-Blé section; the toy-maker Bonhommet, of Auvray; an usher from Montmartre; Crepin the decorator; Caillieaux the ribbon-maker; and the declasse aristocrat Duroure. These unknown Frenchmen purported to be the voice of the people; they were all Parisians and not novices in revolution.

Also on the 29th, the Commune called for an army of 20,000 men to protect and defend Paris.  Robespierre admitted he almost gave up his career because of his anxieties since he became a deputy. On 30 May several new members were added to the Committee of Public Safety: Saint-Just, Couthon and Hérault-Seychelles. On 30 May the department gave its support to the movement; Hanriot was appointed "Commandant-General" of the Parisian National Guard. The next day the tocsin in the Notre-Dame was rung and the city gates were closed; the Insurrection began.

Friday, 31 May 

The insurrection started on 31 May and, directed by the committee at the Évêché (the Bishop's Palace Committee), developed according to the methods already tested on 10 August. At six o'clock in the morning the delegates of the 33 sections, led by Dobsen, presented themselves at Hôtel de Ville, showed the full powers with which the members had invested them, and suppressed the Commune, whose members had retired to the adjourning room. Next, the revolutionary delegates provisionally reinstated the Commune in its functions.

The insurgent committee, which was now sitting at the Hôtel de Ville, dictated to the Commune, now reinstated by the people, what measures it was to take. It secured the nomination of François Hanriot, commandant of the battalion of the Jardin des Plantes, as sole commander-in-chief of the National Guard of Paris. It was decided that the poorer National Guards who were under arms should receive pay at the rate of 40 sous a day. The alarm-gun was fired at six a.m. The assembly of the Parisian authorities, summoned by the departmental assembly, resolved to cooperate with the Commune and the insurrectionary committee, whose numbers were raised to 21 by the addition of delegates from the meeting at the Jacobins. Hanriot's first care was to seize the key positions—the Arsenal, the Place Royale, and the Pont Neuf. Next, the barriers were closed and prominent suspects arrested.
 
The next day the tocsin in the Notre Dame was rung and the city gates were closed. The sections were very slow in getting under way; the workers were at their jobs.  Hanriot was ordered to fire a cannon on the Pont-Neuf as a sign of alarm. When the Convention assembled Danton rushed to the tribune: "Break up the Commission of Twelve! You have heard the thunder of the cannon. Girondins protested against the closing of the city gates, against the tocsin and alarm-gun without the approval of the convention; Vergniaud suggested arresting Henriot. In his turn, Robespierre urged the arrest of the Girondins, who had supported the installation of the Commission of Twelve." Around ten in the morning 12,000 armed citizens appeared to protect the Convention against the arrest of Girondin deputies.

At about five o'clock in the afternoon petitioners from the sections and the Commune appeared at the bar of the Convention. They demanded that 22 Girondin deputies and members of the Commission of Twelve should be brought before the Revolutionary Tribunal, that a central revolutionary army should be raised, that the price of bread should be fixed at three sous a pound, that nobles holding senior rank in the army should be dismissed, that armories should be created for arming the sans-culottes, the departments of State purged, suspects arrested, the right to vote provisionally reserved to sans-culottes only, and a fund set apart for the relatives of those defending their country and for the relief of aged and infirm.

The petitioners made their way into the hall and sat down beside the Montagnards. Robespierre ascended the tribune and supported the suppression of the commissions. When Vergniaud called upon him to conclude, Robespierre turned towards him and said: "Yes, I will conclude, but it will be against you! Against you, who, after the revolution 10 August, wanted to send those responsible for it to the scaffold; against you, who have never ceased to incite to the destruction of Paris; against you, who wanted to save the tyrant; against you, who conspired with Dumouriez... Well, my conclusion is the prosecution of all Dumouriez's accomplices and all those whose names have been mentioned by the petitioners..." To this Vergniaud did not reply. The Convention suppressed the Commission of Twelve and approved the ordinance of the Commune granting two livres a day to workmen under arms. 

Yet the rising of 31 May ended unsatisfactorily. That evening at the Commune, Chaumette and Dobsen were accused by Varlet of weakness. Robespierre had declared from the tribune that the journée of 31 May was not enough. At the Jacobins Billaud-Varenne echoed: "Our country is not saved; there were important measures of public safety that had to be taken; it was today that we had to strike the final blows against factionalism". The Commune, declaring itself duped, demanded and prepared a "supplement" to the revolution.

Saturday, 1 June 
On Saturday the Commune gathered almost all day, devoted to the preparation of a great movement to the Vendée according to Mignet. The National Guard remained under arms. Marat himself repaired to the Hôtel de Ville, and gave, with emphatic solemnity, a "counsel" to the people; namely, to remain at the ready and not to quit until victory was theirs. He himself climbed to the belfry of the Hôtel de Ville and rang the tocsin. The Convention broke the session at six o'clock, at the time when the Commune was to present a new petition against the twenty-two. At the tocsin sound, it assembled again and the petition demanding the arrest of the Girondins was referred to the Committee of Public Safety for examination and report within three days. It ordered Hanriot to surround the Convention ‘with a respectable armed force’.

In the evening 40,000 men surrounded the National palace to force the arrest of the deputies. At 21 hrs the Convention, presided by Henri Grégoire opened the session. Marat lead the attack on the representatives, who in January had voted against the execution of the King and since then had paralyzed the Convention. Several (Guadet, Gensonné) were accused of corresponding with Dumouriez. The Committee of Public Safety postponed decisions on the accused deputies for three days;  Marat demanded a decision within a day. Unsatisfied with the result the commune demanded and prepared a "Supplement" to the revolution.

During the night of 1–2 June the insurrectionary committee, by agreement with the Commune, ordered Hanriot to "surround the Convention with an armed force sufficient to command respect, in order that the chiefs of the faction may be arrested during the day, in case the Convention refused to accede to the request of the citizens of Paris". Orders were given to suppress the Girondin newspapers and arrest their editors. The "Comité insurrectionnel" ordered the arrest of the ministers Roland and Étienne Clavière. That night Paris changed into a military camp according to Otto Flake.

Sunday, 2 June 

Hanriot was ordered to march his National Guard from the town hall to the National Palace. The Convention invited Hanriot, who told them all his men were prepared. In the morning, according to Louis Madelin and Mignet a large force of armed citizens, some estimated 80,000 or 100,000, but Danton spoke of only 30,000, surrounded the Convention with 48 pieces of artillery. "The armed force", Hanriot said, "will retire only when the Convention has delivered to the people the deputies denounced by the Commune." The Committee of Public Safety did not know how to react. The Girondins believed they were protected by the law, but the people on the galleries called for their arrest. The 300 deputies confronted on all sides by bayonets and pikes, returned to the meeting hall and submitted to the inevitable. Twenty-two Girondins were seized one by one after some juggling with names. They finally decided that 31 deputies were not to be imprisoned, but only subject to house arrest.

The session of the Convention was opened with bad news: the chief town of the Vendée, had just fallen into hands of rebels. At Lyons royalist and Girondin sections had gained control of the Hotel de Ville after a fierce struggle, in which it was said that eight hundred republicans had perished. In the Convention, Lanjuinais denounced the revolt of the Paris Commune and asked for its suppression. "I demand," said he, "to speak respecting the general call to arms now beating throughout Paris." He was immediately interrupted by cries of "Down! down! He wants civil war! He wants a counter-revolution! He defames Paris! He insults the people." Despite the threats, the insults, the clamours of the Mountain and the galleries, Lanjuinais denounced the projects of the commune and of the malcontents; his courage rose with the danger. "You accuse us," he said, "of defaming Paris! Paris is pure; Paris is good; Paris is oppressed by tyrants who thirst for blood and dominion." These words were the signal for the most violent tumult; several Mountain deputies rushed to the tribune to tear Lanjuinais from it; but he, clinging firmly to it, exclaimed, in accents of the loftiest courage, "I demand the dissolution of all the revolutionist authorities in Paris. I demand that all they have done during the last three days may be declared null. I demand that all who would arrogate to themselves a new authority contrary to law, be placed outside the law and that every citizen is at liberty to punish them." He had scarcely concluded when the insurgent petitioners came to demand his arrest and that of his colleagues. "Citizens," said they, "the people are weary of seeing their happiness still postponed; they leave it once more in your hands; save them, or we declare that they will save themselves." The demand again was referred to the Committee of Public Safety.

The petitioners went out shaking their fists at the Assembly and shouting: "To arms!". Strict orders were given by Hanriot forbidding the National Guard to let any deputy go in or out.  In the name of the Committee of Public Safety, Barrère proposed a compromise. The twenty-two and the twelve were not to be arrested but were called upon to voluntarily suspend the exercise of their functions. Isnard and Fauchet obeyed on the spot. Others refused. While this was going on, Lacroix, a deputy of the Mountain, rushed into the Convention, hurried to the tribune, and declared that he had been insulted at the door, that he had been refused egress, and that the convention was no longer free. Many of the Mountain expressed their indignation at Hanriot and his troops. Danton said it was necessary to vigorously avenge this insult to the national honour. Barrère proposed that the members of the Convention present themselves to the people. "Representatives," said he, "vindicate your liberty; suspend your sitting; cause the bayonets that surround you to be lowered." 

At the prompting of Barrère, the whole Convention, except the left of the Montagne, started out, led by the president, Hérault de Séchelles, and attempted to exit their way through the wall of steel with which they were surrounded. On arriving at a door on the Place du Carrousel, they found there Hanriot on horseback, saber in hand. "What do the people require?" said the president, Hérault de Séchelles; "the convention is wholly engaged in promoting their happiness." "Hérault," replied Hanriot, "the people have not risen to hear phrases; they require twenty-four traitors to be given up to them." "Give us all up!" cried those who surrounded the president. Hanriot then turned to his people and gave the order: "Canonniers, a vos pieces!" ("Cannoneers, to your guns!"). Two pieces were directed upon the convention, who, retiring to the gardens, sought an outlet at various points, but found all the issues guarded.

The deputies walked round the palace, repulsed by bayonets on all sides, only to return and submit. A screaming Marat forced the deputies to go back to the hall. The next day the Interior minister Garat forced Danton to disavow the events from the evening before. On the motion of Couthon the Convention voted for the suspension and house arrest (arrestation chex eux) under the guard of a gendarme of twenty-nine Girondin members together with ministers Claviere and Lebrun-Tondu.

Aftermath 
Thus the struggle which had begun in the Legislative Assembly ended in the triumph of the Montagnards. The Gironde ceased to be a political force. It had declared war without knowing how to conduct it; it had denounced the King but had shrunk from condemning him; it had contributed to the worsening of the economic crisis but had swept aside all the claims made by the popular movement.

The 31 May soon came to be regarded as one of the great journées of the Revolution. It shared with 14 July 1789 and 10 August 1792 the honor of having a ship of the line named after it. But the results of the crisis left all the participants dissatisfied. Danton's hopes of last-minute compromise had been shattered. Although the Montagnards had succeeded in averting bloodshed, the outrage to the Assembly might well set the provinces on fire. But the Montagnards now had a chance to govern the country and to infuse new energy into national defense.

Though for the popular movement most of the demands presented to the Convention were not achieved, the insurrection 31 May – 2 June 1793 inaugurated new phase in the Revolution. In the course of summer 1793 Revolutionary government was created, maximum and price controls were introduced and Jacobin republic began its offensive against the enemies of the Revolution.

Notes

References

Sources 

French Revolution
1793 events of the French Revolution
Military coups in France
18th-century coups d'état and coup attempts
Peasant revolts